This page provides the summary of Red Bull BC One World Finals South Korea 2013.

On November 30, 2013, the world’s 16 best B-Boys will go head to head in Seoul’s Jamsil Arena to compete for the opportunity to be crowned the Red Bull BC One World Champion in its milestone 10th Anniversary year. After nine months of intense one-on-one battles across six continents, in a record 53 countries, more than 2,000 B-Boys competed to secure a place in the World Final alongside the past eight champions.

In 2013, Red Bull BC One held Cyphers, Regional Finals as well as the World Final. Winners of country Cyphers got the chance to compete in one of six global qualifiers in an attempt to reach the World Final. Following the global Cyphers, the Regional Final season ran from mid-July to mid-September, culminating in the Tenth World Final in late November. Regional Finals were held for the Americas in USA; Eastern Europe in Ukraine; Western Europe in Italy; Latin America in Colombia; Asia Pacific in Japan; and Middle East & Africa in Egypt.

Regional Finals

RBBC1 Latin American 2013 results
Location: Bogota, Colombia

 Arex will represent Colombia and the Latin America Region at the World Finals.

RBBC1 North American 2013 results 
Location: Houston, United States

 Gravity will represent USA and the North American Region at the World Final.

RBBC1 Middle East Africa 2013 results
Location: Amman, Jordan

 Lil Zoo will represent Morocco and the Middle East Africa Region at the World Final.

RBBC1 Western European 2013 results
Location: Naples, Italy

 Froz will represent Italy and the Western European Region at the World Final.
 Menno will represent Netherlands as a Wild Card.

RBBC1 Eastern European 2013 results 
Location: Kyiv, Ukraine

 Robin will represent Ukraine and the Eastern European Region for the World Finals.

RBBC1 Asia Pacific 2013 results 
Location: Fukuoka, Japan

 Nori will represent Japan and the Asia Pacific Region for the World Finals.
 Taisuke will also represent Japan as a Wild Card.

World Finals 
Red Bull BC One will take place in Seoul, Korea on November 30, 2013

Judges 
 Poe One (Style Elements, USA) 
 El Niño (Floor Lords, USA) 
 Ducky (Drifterz, South Korea) 
 Storm (Germany) 
 Lamine (Vagabonds, France)

DJ
 DJ Lean Rock (USA)

Emcee
 Jay Park (South Korea)

2013 Main Event Competitor List

Red Bull BC One 2013 results 
Location: Seoul, Korea

 Hong10 became the winner of the 10th anniversary of the Red Bull BC One.

References

External links
 Red Bull BC One Asia Pacific Finals 2013

Red Bull BC One